Reform is an unincorporated community located in Choctaw County, Mississippi, United States, along Mississippi Highway 15 and is approximately  south of Mathiston.

History
Reform was first established in 1887 and is located on the former Gulf, Mobile and Ohio Railroad. At one point, Reform was home to three general stores. It was also once serviced by a cotton gin and saw mill.

A post office first began operation under the name Reform in 1888.

Lignite was once mined for local use near Reform.

References

Unincorporated communities in Choctaw County, Mississippi
Unincorporated communities in Mississippi